This is a list of American football players who have played for the Brooklyn Horsemen in the first American Football League.  It includes players that have played at least one match in the AFLI season.  The Horsemen franchise was originally merged with the Brooklyn Lions of the National Football League in 1926.

1 Played tailback and wingback
2 Also played center
3 Played fullback and tailback
4 Position later known as quarterback
5 Started season with Hartford Blues
6 Started season with Rock Island Independents
7 Also played end
8 Played tailback, wingback, and blocking back

References
1926 Brooklyn Horsemen Roster

Brooklyn Horsemen players